Bigod is a surname. Notable people with the surname include:

Francis Bigod (1507–1537), British noble
Hugh Bigod (disambiguation), multiple people
Roger Bigod (disambiguation), multiple people
William Bigod (died 1120), English heir
Bigod family

See also
Bigod's rebellion